Apura xanthosoma is a species of moth of the family Tortricidae. It is found in Queensland, Australia.

The wingspan is about 20 mm. The forewings are fuscous, mixed with whitish and suffused with ochreous-brown. The hindwings are grey.

References

Moths described in 1916
Polyorthini
Moths of Australia